Tupua is a genus of Tasmanian araneomorph spiders in the family Physoglenidae that was first described by Norman I. Platnick in 1990.

Species
 it contains four species, found in Tasmania:
Tupua bisetosa Platnick, 1990 (type) – Australia (Tasmania)
Tupua cavernicola Platnick, 1990 – Australia (Tasmania)
Tupua raveni Platnick, 1990 – Australia (Tasmania)
Tupua troglodytes Platnick, 1990 – Australia (Tasmania)

See also
 List of Physoglenidae species

References

Araneomorphae genera
Physoglenidae